Messier 37 (also known as M37 or NGC 2099) is the brightest and richest open cluster in the constellation Auriga. It was discovered by the Italian astronomer Giovanni Battista Hodierna before 1654. M37 was missed by French astronomer Guillaume Le Gentil when he rediscovered M36 and M38 in 1749. French astronomer Charles Messier independently rediscovered M37 in September 1764 but all three of these clusters were recorded by Hodierna. It is classified as Trumpler type I,1,r or I,2,r.

M37 exists in the antipodal direction, opposite from the Galactic Center as seen from Earth, so is in one of the nearby outer arms. Specifically it is still close enough to be in our own. Estimates of its age range from 347 million to 550 million years. It has 1,500 times the mass of the Sun and contains over 500 identified stars, with roughly 150 stars brighter than magnitude 12.5. M37 has at least a dozen red giants and its hottest surviving main sequence star is of stellar classification B9 V. The abundance of elements other than hydrogen and helium, what astronomers term metallicity, is similar to, if not slightly higher than, the abundance in the Sun. As of 2022, it contains only the third known planetary nebula associated with an open cluster.

This cluster is following an orbit through the Milky Way with a period of 219.3 Ma and an eccentricity of 0.22.

Sky charts

See also
 List of Messier objects

References

External links

 Messier 37, SEDS Messier pages
 

Messier 037
Messier 037
037
Messier 037
Perseus Arm
?